Lourdes Becerra Portero (born 4 June 1973 in Sabadell, Catalonia) is a former medley and breaststroke swimmer, who competed at three consecutive Summer Olympics, starting in 1992 in Barcelona. Her best Olympic result came in 1996, when she finished seventh in the 400 m individual medley.

At the 1999 FINA World Swimming Championships (25 m) in Hong Kong she won the bronze medal in the 400 m individual medley. At the 1998 European Short Course Swimming Championships in Sheffield she won silver in the 200 m breaststroke and bronze in the 400 m individual medley.  
  
She started to swim at 10 years old, in the Club Natació Sabadell, her only ever club.

References
 Lourdes Becerra File 
 Spanish Olympic Committee

1973 births
Living people
Swimmers from Catalonia
Spanish female breaststroke swimmers
Spanish female medley swimmers
Olympic swimmers of Spain
Swimmers at the 1992 Summer Olympics
Swimmers at the 1996 Summer Olympics
Swimmers at the 2000 Summer Olympics
Medalists at the FINA World Swimming Championships (25 m)
Mediterranean Games bronze medalists for Spain
Mediterranean Games medalists in swimming
Swimmers at the 1991 Mediterranean Games
Sportspeople from Sabadell
20th-century Spanish women